Nazhūn bint al-Qulāiya al-Gharnātiya (eleventh-century) was a Granadan courtesan and poet, noted for her outrageous verse.

Life
Little is known about Nazhun's life. Medieval Arabic biographical dictionaries and accounts of her poetry are the main sources. Ibn al-Abbar has her as a (near-)contemporary of the twelfth-century Ḥamda bint Ziyād al-Muaddib. Anecdotes about Nazhun also feature Abu Bakr al-Amā al-Makhzumi as Nazhun's teacher of the arts of satire; he seems to have been alive in the twelfth century, at some point after 1145; indeed, Nazhun 'figures so prominently' in biographical entries about al-Makhzumi that 'his fame seems to be completely intertwined with hers'. She was supposedly the daughter of a qadi (judge).

Work

Although little of her work survives, Nazhun is, among medieval Andalusian women poets, probably second only to her contemporary Hafsa Bint al-Hajj al-Rukuniyya in the quantity of her work preserved: classical sources attribute to her twenty-one lines of verse from seven poems. In addition, the later Ùddat al-jalīs by Àlī ibn Bishrī attributes to her a muwashshaḥa of twenty-five lines, giving her the distinction of being the only female poet in the collection. She usually appears getting the better of male poets and aristocrats around her with her witty invective. In Marla Segol's words, "as a rule, Nazhun represents her body in ways that disrupt conventional strategies for control of women’s speech and sexuality, and protests the merchandising of women’s bodies." The study of her work has been hampered by scholars either not comprehending, or choosing not to expound on, its obscenity and double entendres.

In the translation of A. J. Arberry, one of her various ripostes runs:

The poet al-Kutandi challenged the blind al-Makhzumi to complete the following verses:
 If you had eyes to view
 The man who speaks with you—
The blind man failed to discover a suitable continuation, but Nazhun, who happened to be present, improvized after this fashion:
 However many there may be
 All dumbly you’d behold
 His anklets’ shining gold.
 The rising moon, it seems,
 In his bright buttons gleams,
 And in his gown, I trow,
 There sways a slender bough.

Editions
Modern collections of significant bodies of Nazhun's work include:

Dīwān de Las Poetisas de Al-Andalus, ed. by Teresa Garulo (Ediciones Hiperión, 1986), pp. 110 ff.
Nisāʾ min al-Andalus, ed. by Aḥmad Khalīl Jumʻah (Damascus: al-Yamāmah lil-Ṭibāʻah wa-al-Nashr wa-al-Tawzīʻ, 2001), pp. 371–402 [نسـاء من الأندلس, أحمد خليل جمعة].

The following table charts the main early sources on Nazhun and her poetry:

Further reading
 Ben Mohamed, Alfonso Ali, ‘Nazhūn Bint al-Qilā‘ı̄’, Studi Magrebini, 18 (1986), pp. 61–68.
Schippers, Arie, 'The Role of Women in Medieval Andalusian Arabic Story-Telling', in Verse and the Fair Sex: Studies in Arabic Poetry and in the Representation of Women in Arabic Literature. A Collection of Papers Presented at the Fifteenth Congress of the Union Européenne des Arabisants et des Islamisants (Utrecht/Driebergen, September 13–19, 1990), ed. by Frederick de Jong (Utrecht: Publications of the M. Th. Houstma Stichting, 1993), pp. 139–51.
 Hammond, Marlé, 'He said "She said": Narrations of Women's Verse in Classical Arabic Literature. A Case Study: Nazhuūn's Hijā’ of Abū Bakr al-Makhzūmī', Middle Eastern Literatures, 6:1 (2003), 3-18 
Hammond, Marlé, 'He Desires Her? Situating Nazhun's Muwashshah in an Androgynous Aesthetic of Courtly Love', in Muwashshah! Proceedings of the International Conference on Arabic and Hebrew Strophic Poetry and its Romance Parallels, School of Oriental and African Studies, London, 8–10 October 2004, Research Papers on Arabic and Jewish Strophic Poetry (London: RN Books, 2006), pp. 141–156.
 Segol, Marla, 'Representing the Body in Poems by Medieval Muslim Women', Medieval Feminist Forum, 45 (2009), 147–69.
 Tijani, O. Ishaq and Imed Nsiri, 'Gender and Poetry in Muslim Spain: Mapping the Sexual-Textual Politics of Al-Andalus', Arab World English Journal for Translation & Literary Studies, 1.4 (October 2017), 52-67 
 Velázquez Basanta, F. N., 'Nazhūn bint al-Qulayʿī', in Biblioteca de al-Andalus: encyclopedia de la cultura andalusí, 8 vols (Almería: Fundación Ibn Tufayl de estudios árabes, 2012), VI 615a–620b
 Khansa, E. (2022). Nazhūn. In: Sauer, M.M., Watt, D., McAvoy, L.H. (eds) The Palgrave Encyclopedia of Medieval Women's Writing in the Global Middle Ages. Palgrave Macmillan, Cham. https://doi.org/10.1007/978-3-030-76219-3_32-1

References

Arabic-language women poets
Arabic-language poets
12th-century women writers
12th-century Arabic writers
Women poets from al-Andalus
Spanish courtesans